"R.I.P." is a song by American rapper Young Jeezy, released as the second single from his twelfth mixtape It's Tha World (2012). It features vocals from fellow rapper 2 Chainz and was produced by record producer DJ Mustard, who helped to write the song with Young Jeezy and 2 Chainz.

Music video 
The music video was filmed on March 6, 2013 at a Los Angeles club and on March 24, 2013, the music video was released. The music video features cameo appearances from Snoop Dogg, Warren G, Trey Songz,  Nelly, T.I, Big Sean, E-40, Nipsey Hussle, YG, DJ Drama, Ne-Yo and Ludacris.

Remixes 
The official remix was released on March 29, 2013, and features YG, Kendrick Lamar and Chris Brown. In the song Chris Brown drops a subliminal diss towards rapper Drake. On April 7, DJ Skee released an extended remix featuring rapper Riff Raff. The following day the official "G-Mix" was released featuring Snoop Dogg, Too $hort and E-40.

Charts

Weekly charts

Year-end charts

Certifications

Release history

References 

2012 songs
2013 singles
Jeezy songs
2 Chainz songs
Songs written by Jeezy
Songs written by 2 Chainz
Song recordings produced by Mustard (record producer)
Songs written by Mustard (record producer)